The Mount Pingfeng is a mountain in Xiulin Township, Hualien County, Taiwan.

History
In 2017, fluorescent directional signage, ladders, rock dowels and ropes were added to the hiking trail of the mountain.

Geology
The mountain is located within the Central Mountain Range. It is the 98th tallest peak in Taiwan with its main peak reaches a height of 3,250 m.

See also
 List of mountains in Taiwan

References

Pingfeng
Landforms of Hualien County
Mountaineering in Taiwan